is a Japanese comedy manga series written and illustrated by Masahiro Hirakata. It was serialized in Shueisha's Weekly Shōnen Jump from November 2012 to May 2013, with its chapters collected in three tankōbon volumes.

Plot
Haruki Anjō is a police officer eagerly anticipating the arrival of his first junior in the rural and uneventful town of  where he works. However, he certainly didn't expect the rookie to be ex-mercenary Kiruko Otonashi, a green-haired young woman without any common sense who has the unfortunate habit of hilariously failing every single task she tries, often causing more harm than good. And thus, Haruki must take the responsibility of teaching Kiruko how to be a proper policewoman, while covering up and fixing all the trouble she stirs.

Characters

A former mercenary with considerable experience on the battlefield, she later became a policewoman and got assigned to the Nagashima police station (to which officers not wanted by other stations are often sent). Kiruko is depicted as an average-sized young woman who is distinct for having bright green hair and orange eyes (one covered by an eyepatch). Kiruko is considered attractive by many of the other characters, and is also noted for her large bust size, which her colleagues (especially Haruki) often bring up or reference during everyday conversation. She is energetic and enthusiastic about her new job with the police, though often gets carried away, and ends up doing more harm than good.
Due to her extensive training in the military, Kiruko often fails to apply common sense and greatly overreacts to everyday scenarios, or applies military strategies (such as proposing to clear a road with grenades before crossing). Though wanting to do good, Kiruko is oftentimes inexperienced and escalates or overreacts to normal issues (much to the annoyance of Haruki). Kiruko wields two Tonfa Blades, which she carries with her all the time, and is capable of inflicting great damage with them (despite being repeatedly warned by Haruki not to). She is very fast and powerful physically, and seems to be resistant to injuries (such as being stabbed with a knife blade).

Depicted as an "everyday" male police officer at Nagashima station (having been transferred there due to his poor and perverted behavior). Depicted an ordinary in most ways, with reddish-brown hair and yellow eyes, Haruki is sometimes lazy and tries to avoid doing work when on duty. He is the colleague and mentor of Kiruko, being with her most of the time while carrying out their duties and policemen, and as a result, is responsible for her mistakes and accidents (a running gag being that he gets punished whenever Kiruko screws up, often in form of getting his pay deducted).
Unlike Kiruko, Haruki has much more experience in the police force, and is also much calmer (though panics when his plans fail). He confesses himself to be very perverted, often wanting to touch Kiruko's breasts, and would (inadvertently) tell his desires to other characters. Despite his numerous shortcomings, however, Haruki is shown to be generally helpful and competent, often trying his best at helping Kiruko on the job (though he may only be doing this to avoid further pay deductions) or taking the initiative to support others.

The chief of Nagashima station. He has black hair and eyes, and is shown to be older than Haruki. He organises events at the station, has good manners and has a frank and straightforward personality.

Publication
Shinmai Fukei Kiruko-san, written and illustrated by Masahiro Hirakata, was serialized in Shueisha's Weekly Shōnen Jump from November 19, 2012, to May 20, 2013. Shueisha collected its 24 individual chapters in three tankōbon volumes published from March 4 to July 4, 2013.

Volume list

Reception
The series got a fan following after the series' first chapter release, with art community Pixiv having hundreds of pictures.

See also
Debby the Corsifa wa Makezugirai, another manga series by the same author

References

External links

Comedy anime and manga
Police in anime and manga
Shōnen manga
Shueisha manga